Stadion Lokomotiva Praha (formerly known as Stadion na Plynárně) is a stadium in Holešovice, Prague, Czech Republic, opened in 1953. It is currently used mostly for football matches and is the home ground of Loko Vltavín. The ground hosted matches in the 2013–14 Czech National Football League.

Transport
The stadium is around ten minutes' walk from Nádraží Holešovice metro station. Tram services 12 and 14 call at the U Průhonu stop, which is approximately 400 metres west of the stadium entrance.

References

External links
 Stadium profile at vysledky.cz
 Photo gallery and data at Erlebnis-stadion.de

Football venues in Prague
Prague 7
1953 establishments in Czechoslovakia
Sports venues completed in 1953
20th-century architecture in the Czech Republic